Clarence Alfred Bottolfsen (October 10, 1891July 18, 1964) was an American publisher and politician from Idaho, a member of the Idaho Republican Party. He served as the state's 17th and 19th governor, from 1939 to 1941 and again from 1943 to 1945.

Early years
Born in Superior, Wisconsin, Bottolfsen moved with his family to Fessenden, North Dakota, in 1902 where he was educated in the public schools.  While in high school, he worked as a printer's devil (an apprentice or errand boy) in a local printing shop. In 1910, the owner of the shop moved to Arco, Idaho, purchased the Arco Advertiser, and sent for Bottolfsen, then nineteen, to manage it.  He purchased the paper and continued to be the publisher in Arco until 1949. He married Elizabeth Hanna on August 27, 1912.

Career
Bottolfsen entered the U.S. Army on June 27, 1918 and served until four months after the Armistice and was discharged in March 1919.  After the War, he took a leading part in the organization of the American Legion and served as State Commander in 1934.

Bottolfsen served in the Idaho House of Representatives beginning in 1921; he was reelected in 1922, 1926, 1928, and 1930.  From 1925 to 1927 he was the House's chief clerk, speaker in 1931, and start party chairman from 1936 to 1938. He was the first of two in Idaho history to serve non-consecutive terms as governor (Cecil Andrus).

Early in his first term in 1939, Bottolfsen signed the bill creating the Idaho State Police.

While governor in 1944, Bottolfsen was the Republican nominee for the United States Senate, but was defeated by Democrat Glen Taylor in the general election.

He ran for another term as governor in 1946, but lost to C. A. Robins in the June primary.

In his later years, Bottolfsen served as chief clerk of the Idaho House and on the staff of U.S. Senator Herman Welker. He was elected to the state senate in 1958 and 1960, but declined to seek reelection in 1962 due to poor health.

Death and legacy
Bottolfsen was an active Freemason within the Grand Lodge of Idaho, serving as master of Arco Lodge No. 48. He was also active with the El Korah Shrine in Boise, the Rotary Club, and the Arco Chamber of Commerce.

Bottolfsen died in Boise at age 72 from complications from emphysema, which he suffered from in his final years. Bottolfsen Park in Arco is named after him. His papers are contained within the University of Idaho Library in Moscow, and he and his wife are interred at Hillcrest Cemetery in Arco.

References

External links 
 Bottolfsen Park in Arco, Idaho
University of Idaho Library – Clarence A. Bottolfsen (1891-1964), papers, 1926-1964.
National Governors Association
Idaho Genealogy Trails
Idaho State Historical Society: Clarence A. Bottolfsen

1891 births
1964 deaths
American Freemasons
American Lutherans
Deaths from emphysema
Republican Party governors of Idaho
Republican Party members of the Idaho House of Representatives
Republican Party Idaho state senators
People from Boise, Idaho
Politicians from Superior, Wisconsin
American people of Norwegian descent
Speakers of the Idaho House of Representatives
20th-century American newspaper publishers (people)
20th-century American politicians
People from Butte County, Idaho
20th-century Lutherans